Paraconalia is a genus of beetles in the family Mordellidae, containing the following species:

Paraconalia brasiliensis Ermisch, 1968
Paraconalia rufopygidialis Ermisch, 1968

References

Mordellidae
Tenebrionoidea genera